Uralerpeton is an extinct genus of chroniosuchid reptiliomorph from upper Permian (upper Tatarian age) deposits of Vladimir Region, European Russia. It was first named by V. K. Golubev in 1998, from skull fragments and trunk scutes. The type species is Uralerpeton tverdokhlebovae, it was a large predator with a 50 – 55 cm skull and a total length that probably exceeded 3 m (9.3 ft).

References 

Chroniosuchians
Permian tetrapods
Prehistoric tetrapod genera
Fossil taxa described in 1998
Fossils of Russia
Fauna of Russia